Proto-Canaanite is the name given to
(a) the Proto-Sinaitic script when found in Canaan, dating to about the 17th century BC and later. 
(b) a hypothetical ancestor of the Phoenician script before some cut-off date, typically 1050 BCE, with an undefined affinity to Proto-Sinaitic. No extant "Phoenician" inscription is older than 1000 BCE. The Phoenician, Hebrew, and other Canaanite dialects were largely indistinguishable before that time.

See also 
 Canaanite languages
 Deir Alla

References

External links
 Precursor to Paleo-Hebrew Script Discovered in Jerusalem

Bronze Age writing systems
Canaanite languages
Canaanite writing systems
Semitic writing systems